The Japanese Sengoku period from the mid-15th to early 17th century was a time of nearly continual military conflict. Powerful military lords known as daimyōs, such as Oda Nobunaga, Toyotomi Hideyoshi or Tokugawa Ieyasu, struggled to unify Japan. During the Sengoku period, because of constant warfare, many fortifications and castles were built. Archetypal Japanese castle construction is a product of the Momoyama period and early Edo period.

A new era of castle construction began when the daimyo Nobunaga built Azuchi Castle from 1576 to 1579. Earlier fortifications of the Kamakura and Muromachi periods were crude large-scale structures; Azuchi, however, with rich ornamentation and a keep rising seven stories high, became the prototype for castle construction of the period. The style of Azuchi Castle marked a shift in the function of the castles from a place that was merely a fortress and military garrison to a political, cultural and economic center. The newer style castles functioned as home to the daimyōs, his family, and his most loyal retainers. Because of the expense of building such a lavish structure, castles in the style of Azuchi, functioned also to highlight the power and prestige of the daimyōs. These new castles were built of wood and plaster on a stone foundation. Generally the main keep or tenshu was positioned at the highest point, surrounded by a series of interlocking baileys with walls, small towers and pathways. Residential buildings were located in one of the outer circles. The daimyō conducted his business in the citadel.

Almost 100 major castles were built between 1596 and 1615. The peak of castle-building occurred during the years 1600 to 1615: in 1600 Tokugawa Ieyasu defeated the Toyotomi clan in the Battle of Sekigahara; and in 1615 the Toyotomi forces were finally destroyed in the siege of Osaka. The Tokugawa shogunate then limited the number of castles to one per province; and banned the building of new castles entirely in 1620. By the time of the Meiji Restoration in the late 19th century, castles were in a state of disuse and neglect. Seen as symbolic of the ruling elite of previous eras, some castles were dismantled and sold as firewood. Others were destroyed by fire, earthquake or typhoon. Only twelve castles have a donjon that is considered original.

The term "National Treasure" has been used in Japan to denote cultural properties since 1897.
The definition and the criteria have changed since the inception of the term. These castle structures adhere to the current definition, and were designated national treasures when the Law for the Protection of Cultural Properties was implemented on June 9, 1951. The items are selected by the Ministry of Education, Culture, Sports, Science and Technology based on their "especially high historical or artistic value". This list presents nine entries of National Treasures from five castles built during the late Momoyama to early Edo period; however, the number of structures is actually more because in some cases multiple structures have been combined to form a single entry. The structures listed include donjon, watch towers and connecting galleries.

Features

The nine national 
treasures are distributed over five castles as follows: Himeji Castle has five national treasure structures; Hikone Castle, Inuyama Castle, Matsue Castle and Matsumoto Castle each have one. Three main types of 
castles exist. Generally the types are characterised according to the 
topography of the castle's site and named accordingly: 
, which are 
castles built on hills in a plain such as Himeji Castle, Hikone Castle, Inuyama Castle, and Matsue Castle.
The 
donjon can be constructed in two ways. In the older 
 style, the top of the main keep is formed by a type of lookout tower placed on top of one or more hip-and-gable 
(irimoya) style roofs. Hikone Castle, Himeji Castle, 
Inuyama Castle and Matsue Castle are representative of this style. The 
 style represented by the keep of 
Matsumoto Castle has a virtually square foundation. Each level is slightly smaller than the one below but maintains the same shape.

Only in rare cases the 
donjon stands independent of other structures. Generally it is 
. Matsumoto Castle has both styles, renketsushiki in the northwest 
and fukugōshiki in the southeast. At Himeji Castle three watch 
towers, four connecting galleries and the main donjon enclose a 
small courtyard.
A typical keep would have between three and seven stories discernible from the outside. Its inner structure including the number of floors could differ from the outward appearance. Castle towers at Himeji, Inuyama, Matsue and Matsumoto Castle have one floor more than is visible from the outside.

Usage
The table's columns (except for Image) are sortable pressing the arrows symbols. The following gives an overview of what is included in the table and how the sorting works.
Name: name of the structure as registered in the Database of National Cultural Properties
Castle: name of the castle in which the structure is located
Construction: architecture and general remarks including the number of stories (outside) and floors (inside); the column entries sort by the type of structure (donjon, yagura, watariyagura)
Date: period and year of the construction; the column entries sort by year. If only a period is known, they sort by the start year of that period.
Location: "town-name prefecture-name" and geo-coordinates of the structure; The column entries sort as "prefecture-name town-name".
Image: picture of the structure; If the image shows more than one structure, the respective structure is indicated by a blue rectangle.

Treasures

See also
Japanese castle
100 Fine Castles of Japan

Notes
General

Architecture

References

Bibliography

Lists of castles in Japan
Castles
Castles